Volleyball, for the 2013 Island Games, took place at the Berkeley Institute (Pembroke Parish) and the Cedarbridge Academy (Devonshire Parish). This event took place from 14 to 19 July 2013.

Medal table

Events
 Bermuda 2013 Volleyball Results

References

2013 Island Games
2013 in volleyball
2013